Alberto Ascoli (August 15, 1877, in Trieste - September 28, 1957) was an Italian serologist, hygienist and physiological chemist, who developed a test for anthrax.

References

External links
 http://www.whonamedit.com/doctor.cfm/250.html
 

1877 births
1957 deaths
Italian medical researchers
Serologists